The Manua Islands, or the Manua tele (Samoan: Manua tele), in the Samoan Islands, consists of three main islands: Taū, Ofu and Olosega. The latter two are separated only by the shallow, 137-meter-wide Āsaga Strait, and are now connected by a bridge over the strait. Politically, the islands form the Manua District, one of the three administrative divisions of American Samoa.

Manu'a was the political centre of the region for many centuries, until the rise of the Tu'i Tonga maritime empire, which led to a shift in power from the eastern islands of Samoa to its western islands.

Geography
All three islands are high islands: volcanic remnants rising out of the sea 14° south of the equator. The islands are elevated and mountainous. In contrast to most places in the world, the population of these islands has been decreasing steadily for decades.  In the 1930s some 20% of the population of American Samoa lived in the Manua Islands.  By the 1980s, only 6% were located there. Emigration is the consequence of a lack of economic opportunities and a desire of young people to participate in the more modern lifestyle offered on Tutuila (Office of Tourism, 2005). All the land of Manua is owned communally by Samoan families of Manua. This includes the National Parks lands which are only leased to the US National Parks system for 50 years.

History
According to historical Samoan oral tradition, Manu'a was formerly the ruling center of a large Polynesian empire that included the entire Samoan archipelago, as well as other nearby islands, including Tonga and Fiji. The traditional capital of Manua is the village of Taū, on the island of Taū.

The Tui Manu'a 
The sovereign of Manua was traditionally called “Tui Manua,” This title was the progenitor of many of the high titles used in other parts of the Samoan Islands. Manua was the only part of Samoa that was never subjected to Tongan rule, because both the Tongans and the Samoans regarded  Manua as having sacred status. The last Tui Manua was Tuimanua Elisara (sometimes written Tui Manua Elisala), who held the title at the beginning of the 20th century. Before he died on July 2, 1909, he expressed the wish that the title die with him. At the time, the U.S. government took the position that Elisara's title had actually changed to “District Governor” nine years before his death, on June 5, 1900, the day that the U.S. flag had been hoisted at Taū (Office of the Governor, 2004). However, titles and holdings were not obliterated when the islands became a U.S. territory, and the title and estates of Tuimanua remain in the custody of the Anoalo clan (the male Tuimanua line). So the title Tui Manua technically still exists, although no one is the holder of the title.

Below is a list of the names of the known Tui Manu'a: 41 successive generations of title holders, spanning over 2,000 years. Note: these aren't all the title holders.

01) Tui Manu’a Satiailemoa

02) Tui Manu’a Tele or Fitiaumua

03) Tui Manu’a Maugaotele

04) Tui Manu’a Tae O Tagaloa or Folasa

05) Tui Manu’a Fa’aeanu’u or Fa’atutupunu’u

06) Tui Manu’a Saoioiomanu

07) Tui Manu’a Saopu’u

08)  Tui Manu’a Saoloa

09) Tui Manu’a Tu’ufesoa

10) Tui Manu’a Letupua

11) Tui Manu’a Saofolau

12) Tui Manu’a Saoluaga

13) Tui Manu’a Lelologatele

14) Tui Manu’a Alia Matua

15) Tui Manu’a Alia Tama

16) Tui Manu’a Ti’aligo

17) Tui Manu’a Fa’aeanu’u II

18) Tui Manu’a Puipuipo

19) Tui Manu’a Siliaivao

20) Tui Manu’a Manufili

21) Tui Manu’a Fa’atoalia Manu-O-Le-Fale-Tolu

22) Tui Manu’a Segisegi

23) Tui Manu’a Siliave

24) Tui Manu’a Pomelea

25) Tui Manu’a Lite or Tui Aitu

26) Tui Manu’a Toalepa’i

27) Tui Manu’a Seuea

28) Tui Manu’a Salofi

29) Tui Manu’a Levaomana or Lemamana

30) Tui Manu’a Taliutafa Pule

31) Tui Manu’a Ta’alolomanu Moaatoa

32) Tui Manu’a Tupalo

33) Tui Manu’a Seiuli

34) Tui Manu’a U’uolelaoa

35) Tui Manu’a Fagaese

36) Tui Manu’a Tauveve

37) Tui Manu’a Tauilima

38) Tui Manu’a Alalamua

39) Tui Manu’a Makerita

40) Tui Manu’a Elisala – Officially the last Tui Manu’a; died in 1909

41) Tui Manu’a Kilisi Taliutafa – Revived the Tui Manu’a title in 1924, but never fully took office.

US Cession 

The Tripartite Convention of 1899 partitioned the Samoan Islands, giving the U.S. control of the eastern islands (including Tutuila and the Manua Group), and giving European powers control of the western islands (including Upolu and Savaii).

In 1901, Tutuila's leaders agreed to this arrangement. As a result, Manu'a was eventually forced to accept U.S. rule, and they formalized their acceptance in a Deed of Succession, signed by the Tui Manua (supreme chief of Manua) on July 16, 1904. The signing took place at the Crown residence of the Tuimanua (called the Faleula) in Lalopua (according to official documents of the Tuimanua government (Office of the Governor, 2004). Around this time, as of 1903, Manu'a had a total population of approximately 2,000 residents.

Since that time, the Manua Island Group has officially been part of the US Protectorate of American Samoa.

In 1915, in response to the destruction caused to Manu'a that year by a hurricane, both the U.S. Congress and the American Red Cross sent financial aid to American Samoa for the first time.

Society and culture

The history of Manua is said in Samoan oratory to contain the origins of Samoan and Polynesian culture, and the genealogy of Polynesians east of Samoa is said to have originated in Manua.  In traditional belief the sun rises over Samoa at Saua on the island of Taū, where the coral reef is supposed to be always yellow from the sun, and it sets at Falealupo the westernmost village on the island of Savaii in Samoa.  This journey of the sun is strongly related to traditional beliefs and defines the uniformity of cultural identity across both Samoas. The term Fa'asamoa describes "The Samoan Way", or traditional Samoan way of life

Economy 
Today, many families of Manua rely on income from family members working in Tutuila and in the United States.  The local diet is generally healthier than in Tutuila, with less reliance on imported American and New Zealand tinned foods, and a greater reliance on local fishing and farming.

Language

The people of Manua speak the Samoan language and utilize the "t".

Education
The high school on Taū, called Manua High School, serves all of Manua.  Most students seeking higher education go to American Samoa Community College in Tutuila or National University of Samoa on Upolu, or as far away as the University of Hawaii and elsewhere.

References

 McMullin, Dan. 2005. "The Passive Resistance of Samoans to US and Other Colonialisms", article in Sovereignty Matters ,  University of Nebraska Press.
 Office of the Governor. 2004. Manua ma Amerika. A brief historical documentary. Manua Centennial. 16 July 1904. 16 July 2004. Office of the Governor, American Samoa Government. 20 p.
 Office of Tourism. 2005. The Manua Islands. Office of Tourism, Dept. of Commerce, Government of American Samoa (pamphlet).

External links

Samoa News: Manu'a celebrates 105 years under the U.S. Flag
Tui Manu´a ruled Tonga

 
Islands of American Samoa